Grand Trunk Bridge may refer to:
Grand Trunk Bridge (Saskatoon), in Saskatchewan, Canada
Grand Trunk Bridge (South Bend, Indiana), in Indiana, USA